Liaqat Baloch (born 9 December 1952) is a political leader in Pakistan. He is originally from Muzaffargarh, a remote area of southern Punjab – although his family's origins are in the nearby province of Balochistan.

He played an active role in student politics in the late 1970s. And at the University of the Punjab where he was elected president of the Students Union in 1976. He also elected all Pakistan president of Islami Jamiat-e-Talaba in 1977 and 1978. He holds an MA (Mass Communication) and LLB degree from the University of the Punjab. He was a member of the Pakistani parliament in 1985, 1990 and 2002.

Today, Baloch lives in Lahore and currently serving as the Naib Ameer (Deputy Chief) of Jamaat-e-Islami, Pakistan's Islamic religio-political party and also served as the Secretary General of Jamaat-e-Islami until 2019. He was also the secretary-general of the Muttahida Majlis-e-Amal (MMA) and the deputy leader of the opposition in the National Assembly.

His sister-in-law is Dr Tahira Basharat, an important figure attached to the department of Islamic Studies at the University of the Punjab, where she served as Professor and Dean.

See also
 Naeem Siddiqui
 Tehreek-e-Islami
 Abdul Ghafoor Ahmed
 Islami Jamiat-e-Talaba
 Jamaat-e-Islami Pakistan
 Khurshid Ahmad
 Muttahida Majlis-e-Amal
 Sayyid Abul Ala Maududi
 Politics of Pakistan
 Qazi Hussain Ahmad
 List of political parties in Pakistan

References

External links 
 Liaqat Baloch Official Website
 Official bio on Jamaat-e-Islami website (English)
Jamaat-i-Islami Official site (English) 

1952 births
Living people
Baloch politicians
People from Muzaffargarh District
People from Muzaffargarh
Pakistani Sunni Muslims
University of the Punjab alumni
Politicians from Lahore
Muttahida Majlis-e-Amal politicians
Jamaat-e-Islami Pakistan politicians
Politicians from Muzaffargarh